{{DISPLAYTITLE:C6H13NO2}}
The molecular formula C6H13NO2 (molar mass: 131.17 g/mol, exact mass: 131.0946 u) may refer to:

 Aminocaproic acid
 Isoleucine
 Leucine
 β-Leucine
 Norleucine

Molecular formulas